Miss Earth Ghana is a national Beauty pageant that sends representatives to the Miss Earth pageant.

Titleholders 
Color key

References

External links
Official facebook

Beauty pageants in Ghana
Ghanaian awards